Psilolechia is a genus of four species of crustose lichens. It is the only member of Psilolechiaceae, a family that was created in 2014 to contain this genus.

Taxonomy
The genus Psilolechia was established by Abramo Bartolommeo Massalongo in 1860. Formerly classified in the family Pilocarpaceae, molecular phylogenetic analysis showed that Psilolechia represented a distinct lineage that deserved placement at the familial level, the Psilolechiaceae, which was formally circumscribed in 2014. This arrangement was accepted in later large-scale updates of fungal classification. Psilolechiaceae is in the order Lecanorales, in the suborder Sphaerophorineae, which also includes the families Pilocarpaceae, Psoraceae, and Ramalinaceae.

Description
Psilolechiaceae is a monogeneric family of crustose lichens with effuse, ecorticate (lacking a cortex), leprose thalli formed by goniocysts (aggregations of photobiont cells surrounded by short-celled hyphae) containing Trebouxia or stichococcoid algae. The apothecia lack a distinct margin, and the asci are 8-spored and have a cylindrical to clavate shape. They feature a central, elongated tube-like structure, and a non-amyloid ascus wall surrounded by a thin outer layer. Both the tube-like structure and the thin outer layer stain dark blue in K/I. Ascospores are oblong-ovoid to tear-shaped, simple (rarely 1-septate in P. leprosa), and hyaline.

Species
Psilolechia contains four species:
Psilolechia clavulifera (Nyl.) Coppins (1983) – widespread
Psilolechia leprosa Coppins & Purvis (1987) – north-west Europe; Greenland
Psilolechia lucida (Ach.) M.Choisy (1949) – widespread
Psilolechia purpurascens Coppins & Purvis (1987) – Tasmania
Psilolechia species grow in locations that are humid and shaded. P. leprosa tends to grow on mineral-enriched rocks and siliceous rocks, and is often recorded around old mines.

References

Lecanorales
Lichen genera
Lecanorales genera
Taxa named by Abramo Bartolommeo Massalongo
Taxa described in 1860